Sian Marie Gabbidon  (born 28 October 1992) is a British businesswoman, fashion designer and media personality. In 2018, Gabbidon won Series 14 of The Apprentice.

Early life and education 
Sian Gabbidon was born in Leeds on 28 October 1992. She had a passion for football prior to starting high-school, and she played the sport extensively before "switching to fashion" as a teenager. From 2011 to 2014, she attended the University of Huddersfield and graduated with First Class Honours in Fashion Marketing with Design and Production. While studying at university, Gabbidon began designing and producing her own swimwear and selling it online.

The Apprentice 

In 2018, Gabbidon won the 14th series of British reality TV show The Apprentice, defeating nut milk brand owner Camila Ainsworth. After winning the show, she entered into an equal business partnership with Lord Sugar, who had invested £250,000 into the winners' business. On her win, Gabbidon said: “I can’t believe it’s happened. Not that I didn’t think I could win it but it’s just real. It’s crazy. I’m absolutely over the moon.”

Career 
In 2016, Gabbidon launched her own swimwear and fashion brand "Sian Marie" which became an equal partnership with Alan Sugar after winning The Apprentice. Initially selling through its website, the brand expanded to sell through ASOS. 

After a tough COVID year, Sian adapted her swimwear brand and launched a new loungewear collection. This sell out range had celebrity fans including the likes of Molly-Mae Hague & Maura Higgins. And since launching Sian Marie has now found major success both UK and internationally. It recently launched nationwide in George @ ASDA stores around the UK in a 7-figure deal https://direct.asda.com/george/women/sian-marie/D1M2G1C15,default,sc.html as well as being stocked in major retailers in Dubai, Germany, Ireland and more.

Gabbidon said that her business role model is Coco Chanel who she identifies with as Chanel "came from nothing and worked her way to the top".

References 

The Apprentice (British TV series) candidates
1992 births
Living people
Alumni of the University of Huddersfield
Businesspeople from Leeds
British women business executives